Adaina everdinae is a moth of the family Pterophoridae. It is found in Salta Province, Argentina.

The head is and olive-brown, but grey-whíte between the base of the antennae. The thorax and tegulae are yellowish-white. The forewings are grey-white with brown markings and grey fringes. The underside is grey-brown. The hindswings are pale grey-brown with grey-brown fringes. The underside is also grey-brown.

Adults have been recorded in April and December.

References

Moths described in 1991
Oidaematophorini